Tune Talk Sdn Bhd, DBA Tune Talk, is a mobile virtual network operator (MVNO) riding on the network of Celcom (Malaysia) Berhad. Tune Talk entered into an MVNO agreement with Celcom in December 2008. Tune Talk appointed Ameen Amaendran Abdullah as their CEO in 2018, taking over from Jason Lo who is credited with developing the company to its modern state.

Tune Talk Sdn. Bhd. officially launched its commercial service on 19 August 2009 with a pre-fix "010" cellular service by offering lower IDD calling up to 10% cheaper compared with competitors.

As of today, Tune Talk is the largest  mobile prepaid MVNO service provider in Malaysia.

Tune Talk's business model emphasises customer care service and customer experience. It has an in-house customer care department and social media team.

Works are underway to enter into MVNO deals with network operators in Singapore, Indonesian, Thailand, Cambodia, Myanmar and the Philippines between 2010 up to 2013. Tune Talk is a MVNO and a licensed Network Service Provider and Application Service Provider with Numbering Block sanctioned by the Malaysian Communications and Multimedia Commission (MCMC). On 21 June 2021, Celcom Axiata Berhad announced the sale of its 35% stake in Tune Talk to Digi.com.

Data Roaming

Tune Talk offers an unlimited data roaming plan for RM38 a day across Bangladesh, Cambodia, Hong Kong, Indonesia, Macao, Philippines, Singapore, Sri Lanka and Taiwan.

Top shareholders
 Celcom - Owning 35%
 Tune Ventures - Owning 35.7%
 Gurtaj Singh Padda- Owning 9.6%
 East Pacific Capital Private Limited - Owning 5.85%
 Datuk Seri Kalimullah Masheerul Hassan
 Lim Kian Onn
 Mark Lankaster (CEO of Tune Hotels)

Celcom controls the largest equity stake in Tune Talk with over 35% while another 32% is held by Tune Group Sdn Bhd, of which Fernandes and Dato' Kamarudin Meranun jointly hold a 100% stake. The remaining shares are held by Tune Strategic Investments Limited, and various individuals including Dato' Sri Kalimullah Hassan, Lim Kian Onn, Jason Lo, Gurtaj Singh Padda and Mark Lankester.

Tune Talk Jimat 
Tune Talk announce new Jimat plan in early 2023. These new prepaid plans consist of the following;

 Hi15
 Call20
 Hi35
 Fokus33
 Fokus40
 Bebas55

References

External links
 
 Shopee

Telecommunications companies of Malaysia
Mobile phone companies of Malaysia
Internet service providers of Malaysia
Axiata
Mobile virtual network operators
Tune Group
Privately held companies of Malaysia